The Nusatsum River is a river in the Bella Coola Valley of the Central Coast region of British Columbia, Canada.  It is a tributary of the Bella Coola River, flowing northwest to meet that river just upstream of the community of Hagensborg.

"Nusatsum" has been spelled variously as Nootsatsum, Noosatum, and Nutsatsum.

See also
Nusatsum Mountain
List of British Columbia rivers

References

Bella Coola Valley
Rivers of the Pacific Ranges
Range 3 Coast Land District